Haus im Ennstal is a village in central Austria, located in the Liezen district of Styria. It is an important town on the Enns river.

Haus is a well-known ski resort and has hosted World Cup alpine races several times, and the women's events of the World Championships in 1982. It offers a skiable field of  served by 52 ski lifts.

References

External links
 

Schladming Tauern
Cities and towns in Liezen District
Ski areas and resorts in Austria